Vera sto Dexi (English translation: wedding ring on the right [hand]) is a Greek television soap opera. Created by Helena Akrita and Yiorgos Kiritsis, Vera sto Dexi combines elements of drama, mystery, adventure and occasionally comedy. The series stars Katia Dandoulaki, Kostas Kazakos, Marianna Toumassatou, Elissavet Moutafi, Alexandros Stavrou, Iro Loupi and Danis Katranidis, among others, and aired daily on Mega Channel.

Origin and story overview
Vera sto Dexi was created by journalist Helena Akrita and writer Yiorgos Kiritsis as a lead-in to the 8 p.m. Mega Channel's newscast and as a daily series that would revolutionize the concept of a daily show as a regular dramatic series instead of a soap opera. The pilot episode aired in Greece, Cyprus, Europe, Africa and Asia at the same time, through NOVA Greece, Mega Channel and Mega Cyprus and other TV stations. In early 2007, Mega Channel announced that the third season, which premiered September 17, 2006, would be the last one for the series. The third season's finale aired on July 1, 2007. A total of 625 episodes were broadcast and one behind-the-scenes/bloopers featurette, which aired one day after the series' finale.

A major concept of the series is the influence the past has on the present and the future. Vera sto Dexi refers to the consequences of a murder in which three young women had been involved, twenty years before the time setting of the series' storyline. The ongoing war between two ruthless businessmen, the very wealthy and powerful Diamantis Amiras (Kostas Kazakos), who owns the largest group of companies in the Balkans, and Aggelos Antipas (Danis Katranidis), and its influence on the lives of the characters of the series is also a recurring theme. The title refers to the exploration of marital relationships and the use of the wedding band as a symbol of commitment to another person or cause. Many of the show's most important events take place during a wedding or relate to the influence of such an event.

Plot and characters

First season (2004-2005)
The main storyline of the first season was that of Stratos Antipas (Alexandros Stavrou), brother of the murdered Aggelos Antipas and his efforts to avenge his brother's death, by ruining the lives of the four women he considered responsible for the murder. The women are Kleri Mela (Katia Dandoulaki), a widely respected book publisher, her niece Reggina Kamba (Marianna Toumassatou), renowned lawyer, and Reggina's best friends, Elsa Saranti (Elissavet Moutafi), a young former singer engaged to the son of businessman Diamantis Amiras, Stefanos (Konstantinos Kazakos), and Dora Aggelidi-Sarri (Iro Loupi), a repressed housewife whose quotidian life is falling apart. As a child, Stratos witnessed the three younger women murder his older brother and legal guardian in self-defence (as he had attacked Reggina, who had been his lover, in jealous rage over their separation) and was sent to an orphanage. Having closely followed the women's lives, Stratos also targeted Kleri, who knew about the murder and kept it a secret. At that point in the series, Stratos was working as an assistant/hitman for Amiras, who had adopted him and had raised him like a son, resulting in a competitive relationship with Amiras's biological son, Stefanos. Stratos pursued Reggina romantically under an alias, and went on to ruin her life on many levels, culminating on the public and personal humiliation of abandoning her at the altar on their wedding. Stratos subsequently revealed his true identity and the reasons behind his actions to a desperate Reggina, and tortured her by forcing her to endure his affair with her best friend Dora, blackmailing her not to reveal the truth. He also made sure Elsa was sent to jail on her wedding day for a murder she did not commit, and engaged in a heated affair with Dora, after introducing a young prostitute named Aliki Karra (Mandy Lambou) to her husband Antonis Sarris (Konstantinos Konstantopoulos), thus ruining her seemingly perfect family life. Enchanted by Dora's strict ethics and healthy lifestyle as well as fond of her children who reminded him of his own traumatic childhood in the orphanage, Stratos chose to give up on his war against the four women. Meanwhile, Elsa was cleared of all charges and moved in with the severely depressed Reggina. Eventually, Kleri, Reggina and Elsa decided to reveal the truth about Stratos to Dora. When Dora found out the truth, she suffered a nervous breakdown and violently repelled Stratos. The latter, feeling he had been deprived of his chance to rebuild his life, attacked Reggina and tried to kill her. Reggina shot him, in an echo of her encounter with his late brother. Stratos survived the injury and, in an act of remorse, cleared Reggina of all charges. After Stratos's recovery, a mysterious benefactor contacted Reggina with information on the murder and the events that led to it. Stratos was thus forced to collaborate with Reggina in order to uncover the mystery. The evidence led to the war between Amiras, Stratos's employer and stepfather and Aggelos Antipas, Stratos's presumably deceased brother. Stratos discovered the truth about himself: he was Amiras's son and was not related to Aggelos by blood. Feeling lost and betrayed, Stratos confronted Amiras, his biological father and was forced to confess his developing attraction to Reggina. The two shared a night of passion, resulting in Reggina's pregnancy. Feeling guilty about his relationship to Aggelos's former lover, Stratos left Reggina a second time. The season ended with the discovery that Aggelos was still alive. He had been hiding in New York City for years, waiting for his return. The discovery and Aggelos's comeback changed everything for everyone.

Second season (2005-2006)
Having returned to Athens, Greece, Aggelos was finally ready to avenge his rival, Amiras. Explaining his disappearance, Aggelos claimed to have been hunted down by Amiras, after a tragic and much publicized shipwreck scandal. Amiras made sure his former partner, Aggelos, was entirely blamed for the tragedy. As a direct consequence, Aggelos was wanted and had to flee the country. He staged his own death, convincing the young women they had killed him. Aggelos asked for Stratos's help to destroy Amiras, but Stratos rebelled against him, telling him he had destroyed his life by letting him go to an orphanage and abandoning him without a second thought. Other new characters include Andreas Kairis (Panayiotis Bouyiouris), a successful journalist and old friend of Stratos's, and his newspaper editor, Iakovos Sideris (Kostas Arzoglou). Meanwhile, Reggina's pregnancy continued, but the father's identity was kept secret from everyone, except Kleri and Elsa. Stratos eventually discovered the truth about Reggina's pregnancy and decided to take the baby from her and raise the child on his own. Reggina told him that she would rather die than let him take the baby, and fought in every possible way to protect her from him. In the meantime, Dora had re-approached Stratos and the two re-entered their relationship, with Stratos lying about Reggina's pregnancy. Aggelos had already started his vengeance rampage, with Kleri. Right before Aggelos left Greece, staging his death, his wife had abandoned him, taking his only daughter with her. For a long time, Aggelos had researched the cause of her actions, only to discover Kleri had informed his wife of his affair with the then-teenage Reggina. After returning to Greece, Aggelos seduced Kleri, exposed her infidelity to her politician husband Aris Moschonas (Stathis Kakavas) and the media, destroying her personally and professionally. He then approached his former lover Reggina and offered to protect her from Stratos, when she gave birth to the baby. She declined his offers repeatedly, until she gave birth to her daughter. At that point, Dora discovered the truth about Stratos and Reggina's night of passion and their platonic relationship. Borderline psychotic, Dora decided to stay with Stratos, offering to raise his baby with Reggina with him. She kept making elaborate schemes, considering mostly legal action against Reggina, going almost insane in her effort to defeat her old friend. She eventually married Stratos, but her personality was largely changed by the fame and wealth she eventually obtained. Meanwhile, Elsa embarked on a romantic relationship with Andreas, Stratos's best friend. Their relationship is widely regarded as the healthiest relationship of the series, as opposed to the sadistic and frequently perverse love of Reggina and Stratos. However, Elsa and Andreas were also challenged in many ways, particularly by her ex-husband, Stefanos, who pursued them and took legal action against Elsa's capacity as legal guardian of their child. However, the charges were cleared when Stefanos was discovered to have been the mastermind behind many criminal actions, including a murderous attack against Elsa. Stefanos was aided by his lover, the murderous Ragna. Reggina finally accepted Aggelos's marriage proposal, when Stratos attempted to abduct their daughter. However, the two finally managed to resolve their differences, and finally admitted their love for one another, moving in together. Stratos divorced Dora, who went on to regain her mental health, but Aggelos refused to leave Reggina. Towards the end of the series, Aggelos presented Reggina with a tape featuring Stratos murdering a man. Reggina was forced to succumb to his blackmail. In order to save Stratos, Reggina lied to him and hurt his feelings to prevent the final battle between him and Aggelos. Unable to keep going with the lies and pain, Reggina attempted to kill both herself and Aggelos. Aggelos was saved with light injuries, but Reggina ended up in a coma. Stratos finally discovered the truth and went back to Reggina, who recovered. Eventually, working as a team, Kleri, Amiras, Reggina, Elsa, Stratos and Andreas managed to destroy Aggelos's plan to gain control of Amiras' group of companies. Realizing everything he fought for had fallen apart, Aggelos vowed to take revenge. In the 2-hour season finale, he attempted to murder Reggina and frame Stratos for the crime. Stratos found him and shot him, freeing Reggina. Realizing what he had done, Stratos was consumed by horror and guilt and ran away. Kleri and Elsa tried to help Reggina overcome her grief, while Amiras stepped up and took full responsibility for the shooting of Aggelos, thus saving his son. It was announced that Aggelos would in fact survive the injuries, but would be left incapacitated. Stratos's friends, Andreas and Takis were left looking for the guilt-driven Stratos. Dora left Athens with her family, in an optimistic attempt to start over, having finally managed to mend her relationship with her ex-husband Antonis and her friends. The season ended with a scene of Reggina holding her baby daughter, telling her that they would have to survive alone from this point on.

Third season (2006-2007)
In the third season, the storyline took place in Trikala where Reggina, Elsa, Andreas and Iakovos moved to start a new life. However, Reggina still couldn't forget Stratos and cried all day for him. Meanwhile, new characters were presented such as Danae with her husband Miltos and Olia with her husband Christos. In addition, Kleri decided to also come to Trikala but unfortunately she witnessed the death of Christos who fell from Trikala's clock tower. This remarked the beginning of new stories of mystery. Stratos was in a desert and he was thinking of Reggina and his daughter. At the same time Aggelos made his new plans to destroy his enemies and most of all Amiras after he was left disabled. Back to Trikala the police began to investigate the case of Christos's death. At the beginning, they thought he committed suicide but then they were sure he was murdered because of a legend called the "13th key" about a treasure with enormous power. However, they couldn't find the murderer. The main suspect was Olia, who went to jail and Reggina decided to defend her as her lawyer. Those days, Amiras was released from prison and Stratos after a stranger had visited him and left him a piece of a map was afraid that something bad would happen. In addition to all this, Elsa was pregnant, told Andreas about her pregnancy and decided to marry. Stratos on the other hand found out that Reggina and his daughter were in terrible danger and decided to come as soon as possible after a man was murdered in front of him. Meanwhile, Elsa and Andreas got married and Stratos came to Trikala the other day. Reggina was shocked when she saw Stratos but he kissed her. Everybody was shocked by Stratos's return and at first didn't want to see him.

Cultural impact and references
Contrary to the usual negative buzz surrounding daytime soap operas, Vera sto Dexi has been critically lauded. Many scholars and academics have praised the series for its powerful use of dialogue, and its ingenious character development. Despite the fact that the series has featured a love triangle, the romantic storyline has never been the center of the action. Many Greek actors have appeared in the series, including theater veterans Katia Dandoulaki, Kostas Kazakos, Danis Katranidis and Kostas Arzoglou. The series has also been praised by the media as genuinely complex, powerfully moving and well-written. One of the series' creators, Helena Akrita, has been quoted as saying that she is usually in charge of the more emotional storylines and the development of the female characters, whereas her co-writer and fellow creator of the show Yiorgos Kiritsis chooses the more mysterious, adventurous storylines and is responsible for the development of the male characters. The show is full of references to poetry, music, film and worldwide literature, and is known for its expression of frequent and different political opinions. It is also known for the many social issues it has tackled, such as the position of women in modern societies and cultures, childhood abuse, the state of the penitentiary system and justice and more.

Mega Channel original programming
Greek-language television shows
Greek television soap operas
2004 Greek television series debuts
2007 Greek television series endings
2000s Greek television series